Hydro Project Station is a village in Kohima district of Nagaland state of India. The total population of the village is about 59.

References

Villages in Kohima district